Re Cardiff Savings Bank [1892] 2 Ch 100, often called the Marquess of Bute's case is a UK company law case, concerning the duty of care owed by members of the board. It is old law, but is still often mentioned as an extreme example of to what extent a "subjective" duty of care (as opposed to an objective duty of care under the modern law, see Re D'Jan of London Ltd and s.174 Companies Act 2006) allowed directors to escape consequences of their negligence.

The court held that there was no breach of duty of care for failing to attend bank meetings. It is unlikely in modern corporate law that this decision would be reached on the facts.

Facts
The Marquess of Bute as an infant of six months was installed in 1848 on the board of directors as "President" of the Cardiff Savings Bank, in effect inheriting the office from his father.  The company was plunged into insolvency in 1886 when Lord Bute was 38 years old. He had been to a board meeting when he was 21, in 1868, and apparently signed the minutes. But he was generally ignorant of the company's affairs. The company went insolvent because the directors defrauded the company of large sums of money. The liquidator wanted Lord Bute to make a contribution for the losses.

Judgment
Stirling J held that the duty owed by Lord Bute was essentially to be determined by the knowledge and capability of the director himself. Lord Bute was not liable because he was entitled to rely on the other directors to have done their own jobs and there was no extra duty on him to oversee that..

References

United Kingdom company case law
1892 in case law
1892 in British law
High Court of Justice cases
History of Cardiff
Banking in Wales